The 2014 Volta ao Algarve was the 40th edition of the Volta ao Algarve cycling stage race. It was rated as a 2.1 event on the UCI Europe Tour, and was held from 19 to 23 February 2014, in Portugal.

The race was won by  rider Michał Kwiatkowski – taking the first stage race win of his career – after taking the race lead with a solo stage victory on the second stage; he further extended his lead in the following day's individual time trial, before holding his lead to the end of the race. Contador won the queen stage of the race on the penultimate day, to the Alto do Malhão, while Costa finished second on three stages, and finished as the best-placed Portuguese rider.

Portuguese cyclists were prominent in the race's other classifications. Costa's consistent finishing allowed him to take home the green jersey as the winner of the points classification, while 's Valter Pereira and 's César Fonte held the lead from start to finish of the mountains and sprints classifications respectively. Costa's  squad were the winners of the teams classification, after Chris Horner also finished inside the top ten overall and Sacha Modolo took a stage victory on the opening day.

Race overview

Stages

Stage 1
19 February 2014 — Faro to Albufeira,

Stage 2
20 February 2014 — Lagoa to Monchique,

Stage 3
21 February 2014 — Vila do Bispo to Sagres, individual time trial (ITT)

Stage 4
22 February 2014 — Almodôvar to Loulé–Alto do Malhão,

Stage 5
23 February 2014 — Tavira to Vilamoura,

Classification leadership table

References

External links

Volta ao Algarve
2014
Volta ao Algrave